Tadahiro Kosaka (born February 10, 1960, in Wakayama) is a retired Japanese male race walker. He competed for Japan at three consecutive Summer Olympics: 1988, 1992 and 1996.

International competitions

References

sports-reference

1960 births
Living people
Sportspeople from Wakayama Prefecture
Japanese male racewalkers
Olympic male racewalkers
Olympic athletes of Japan
Athletes (track and field) at the 1988 Summer Olympics
Athletes (track and field) at the 1992 Summer Olympics
Athletes (track and field) at the 1996 Summer Olympics
Asian Games bronze medalists for Japan
Asian Games medalists in athletics (track and field)
Athletes (track and field) at the 1990 Asian Games
Athletes (track and field) at the 1994 Asian Games
Medalists at the 1990 Asian Games
Medalists at the 1994 Asian Games
World Athletics Championships athletes for Japan
Japan Championships in Athletics winners
20th-century Japanese people
21st-century Japanese people